The American University in Bulgaria (AUBG) is a private university in Blagoevgrad, Bulgaria. Established in 1991, AUBG had about 1,000 students from over 40 countries on 5 continents as of Fall 2019. Close to 50% of the students are international.

History
Founded in 1991, the American University in Bulgaria is the first American-style, liberal arts undergraduate education institution in Eastern Europe. The university is a cooperative venture established with the support of the U.S. and Bulgarian governments, the Open Society Institute, the City of Blagoevgrad, and the University of Maine.
When it opened its doors in September 1991, AUBG welcomed a first-year class of 208 students and 16 full-time faculty members. Nowadays, around 1000 students from over 40 countries live and study in AUBG.

By May 2019, twenty-four classes of around 5,000 students had graduated from AUBG.

Funding
The university has three sources of funding: its endowment (which came largely from gifts from the United States Agency for International Development and the Soros Foundation), gifts, and tuition. Friends from all over the world, among them, John Dimitry Panitza, Anna Tchaprachikoff, Minko Balkanski, Atanas Zamphiroff, the America for Bulgaria Foundation, have supported the university throughout the years.

Accreditation
Baccalaureate degrees conferred by AUBG are accredited in both Bulgaria and the United States. AUBG is institutionally accredited in the United States from the New England Association of Schools and Colleges. The university also issues a European Diploma Supplement (part of Europass), which confers automatic recognition of the AUBG degree throughout Europe.

Rankings

A university survey in 2016 found that sixty-five percent of graduating students received more than one job offer or higher degree program acceptance letter when they applied for work or a higher degree upon completing their studies at AUBG. Approximately 20 percent of graduates earned more than $100,000/year and over 20 percent of alumni from 1995-2005 who were currently working in the U.S. earned more than $250,000/year.

Academics

The university follows the traditional American-style of education liberal arts. At AUBG, students benefit from small class-sizes, interactive classroom environment, and close interaction with professors. More than 60% of the students graduate from AUBG with two majors or a major and a minor. More than half of graduating seniors complete double majors, while many undergraduates supplement their main field of study with a minor in one of 19 disciplines offered at AUBG.

The university employs about 70 faculty members from over 15 countries.

AUBG maintains close relationships with universities both in Bulgaria and abroad. In the United States, AUBG students can choose to spend a year or a semester at one of several hundred universities through the International Student Exchange Program (ISEP). In Europe, AUBG is the holder of a standard Erasmus Charter and has bilateral Erasmus Programme agreements with over 50 institutions.

Graduate programs

In addition to its undergraduate program, the university offers an Executive MBA program and a joint venture Executive Master in Finance, Banking & Real Estate with SDA Bocconi. Both programs are delivered in Elieff Center in Sofia

Non-degree programs
The university offers a number of trainings and courses. Most of the trainings are held in the AUBG Elieff Center for Education and Culture in Sofia. 
	
The Blagoevgrad-based English Language Institute offers English-language instruction at all levels and for all ages year-round. It is also a certified Internet-based TOEFL testing center.

Tuition and scholarships
AUBG offers spring and fall semester admission on a rolling basis.

The university offers need- and merit-based aid to deserving students. Financial aid, various scholarships, and student assistant positions  – the university makes sure that students get financial support while pursuing high-quality education.

The AUBG Tchaprachikoff scholarship provides partial funding for tuition for up to two years for Bulgarian AUBG graduates who are admitted to a graduate program in any one of the top 20 national universities in the United States or to any one of the top 20 U.S. schools in the respective fields.

Campus

The Skaptopara campus in Blagoevgrad is home to the university undergraduate programs. It includes three residence halls; Balkanski Academic Center, which houses classrooms, computer labs, and offices; Panitza Library, the largest English-language library in Southeast Europe; and a unique Student Center.

AUBG is the first institution in Bulgaria with an American style housing system. Undergraduate students live on campus as part of the university mission.

The residence halls are a smoke-free environment and disability accessible. Activity areas include aerobic rooms, music practice rooms, multipurpose rooms, billiard and ping pong areas, several television lounges, outside decks, kitchens, and cafes. All of our residence halls are secured 24 hours with a security guard. There are common areas where students can either study or rest along with friends. If a student need anything, he/she can go to the reception desk and ask a Resident Assistant for help.

John Dimitry Panitza, a Bulgarian philanthropist and AUBG founder, is the patron of Panitza Library. Through Panitza's efforts, the library developed into a modern center of learning and the largest English-language library in the region. Panitza Library's modern facilities are equipped with computers, Internet, audio-visual center, and supporting copying services. Access to electronic resources is organized through the library web portal.

The Balkanski Academic Center bears the name of physicist Minko Balkanski The center was dedicated to Professor Balkanski and his family in 2010.

Student life
AUBG students can join a club, a student media, a sports team, or an activity such as theater, musical, AUBG Choir, debating, Model United Nations simulations, and public service.

Student government
Established in 1991, the AUBG Student Government provides a venue for students to practice the tenets of democracy and make a difference in campus decisions. It is a directly elected representative body of the students at AUBG. The Student Government holds its sessions weekly. It has a yearly budget, which is allocated among the student clubs and organizations.

Clubs

AUBG hosts chapters of international organizations, such as People to People International, AIESEC, the Phi Beta Delta Honor Society, and the Association for Computing Machinery. Social and sports organizations, such as the AUBG Olympics, Basketball Club, Debate Club, Chess Club, Women in Business Club are also available.

Student club The Hub organizes a hackathon on campus that gathers some of the country's brightest young programmers for three days of problem solving and coding.

More Honors (MH) is a small part of the AUBG student body that is selected to represent the funny and bright side of student life. More Honors is made by students for students, faculty, staff and friends who make More Honors what it is. MH has been entertaining the AUBG student body for almost twenty four years. Its purpose is to represent student life in a show, while the entire community, together, has a good time and laugh at their own strengths and faults.

The Better Community Club members work on social projects. Their activities include a multi-year educational project at Blagoevgrad's "St. Nikolay Mirlikliyski" orphanage; fundraising campaigns for local centers for people with disabilities and a local family afflicted with serious health problems; and others.

The students from the Business Club invite business figures, politicians, and economists, to talk to students on business-related topics.

The Assets Trading & Management (AT&M) is a student organization which operates as an investment fund where students learn analytical framework for the analysis of the financial markets.

The AUBG Choir brings the music talents of AUBG and the local community together. It was created in 1993 by its director – associate professor of music – Hristo Krotev. The choir has received a number of national and international awards.

The Broadway Performance Club stages musicals for the students and faculty every year. The AUBG community has already seen Chicago, West Side Story, Hairspray, Moulin Rouge, Grease, Memphis, All Shook Up, Burlesque, Catch me If You Can and Hair. After its performances in Blagoevgrad, the musical goes on a tour around the country.

The AUBG Dance Crew is a club that invites students to learn hip-hop dancing mostly to perform in university's talent shows and events. It is a great club for those who wants to up their dancing skills, teach peers and even stage their own choreography.

The Polygon club is the mathematics club on campus that has the goal of increasing the awareness of the mathematics major at AUBG by organizing different activities such as mathematical sessions, quizzes, competitions, lectures, meetings with faculty or alumni, mathematical games, etc.

Acceleration Program Elevate 
Building on its long and successful history with entrepreneurship, AUBG launched its first-ever Acceleration Program Elevate in 2019. The brainchild of University Council Chair and Eleven Founding Partner Daniel Tomov (‘97), the accelerator helps student entrepreneurs and recent alumni start their first businesses.  During the four-month program, teams of two to four AUBGers have access to many workshops, training and a mentorship network of experienced entrepreneurs and AUBG alumni. Each team gets $5000 as capital to kick-start their development. Designed to provide students with startup guidance, the accelerator doubles as a way to support the university: AUBG will have a 5% stake in each company that comes out of the program.

Student media 
There are several student media on campus (broadcast, print, and electronic) which chronicle university events and town life, among them student newspaper AUBG Daily, and Bulgaria's oldest private radio station Radio AURA.

Research and innovation

Students participate in conferences and competitions worldwide, such as the Carroll Round International Student Research conference at Georgetown University, USA and the annual Microsoft's Imagine Cup competition. The Goldman Sachs Global Leaders Program has repeatedly recognized AUBG students’ potential. AUBG hosts its own research conference every year, where students and faculty present research projects.

In Fall 2016, the innovation hub “Aspire” opened doors. It encourages AUBG students to create something, whether it is a start-up business, a tech venture or a book. “Aspire” is a shared working space that aims to foster the exchange of ideas among the AUBG community and to facilitate the transformation of creative visions into reality. The hub is a home of many events related to innovation, inventiveness and inspiration.

Athletics

Every year, AUBG holds its own Olympic games. In the AUBG Olympics, students compete in sports disciplines, such as long jump, soccer, basketball, volleyball, arm wrestling, tug-of-war, horseshoe throwing, and boxing. The university has its own American football team, the AUBG Griffins. Residence halls host table tennis, billiards, aerobic fitness rooms, and gym facilities. Just behind the ABF, the AUBG students can enjoy outdoor sports at the newly built sports facilities. The new premises feature a basketball court, a football field, two tennis courts and a volleyball court. The new fields help AUBG students to enjoy their favorite sports even more. Those interested in skiing, hiking, horseback riding, boxing, kickboxing, aerobics, volleyball, baseball, yoga, tae kwon do, softball, and karate have formed student clubs and intramural teams. Every semester there are soccer and basketball intramural competitions.

Lecture series and conferences
The university hosts business practitioners, scholars and public figures year-round, among them President Rosen Plevneliev (2012-2017) and Bulgaria's EU Commissioner Kristalina Georgieva. Some of the university lecture series include the Distinguished Lecturers Series, the Visiting Poets and Writers Series and the Book Presentations and Readings Series. The American University in Bulgaria regularly hosts international conferences such as AMICAL, ISIH and GLAA.

Notable people
Elizabeth Kostova, former AUBG board member, AUBG University Council member since 2011, author of the bestselling novels The Historian and The Swan Thieves
Aernout van Lynden, a Dutch-British journalist with over twenty years of experience as a war correspondent in the Middle East and the Balkans, former AUBG professor
Sohel Taj (born 5 January 1970) is a retired Bangladesh Awami League politician and former State Minister of Home Affairs. He is the son of Bangladesh's first Prime Minister Tajuddin Ahmad.Bangladesh Awami League. He has three sisters, Sharmin Ahmad Reepi, Simeen Hussain Rimi and Mahjabin Ahmad Mimi. He obtained bachelor of business administration degree from the American University in Bulgaria and masters from Gordon University in the United States in 2008.
Ralitsa Vassileva, anchor for CNN International, Atlanta, USA, AUBG Doctor of Humane Letters (2001)
Zhelyu Zhelev, first democratically elected president of the Republic of Bulgaria (1990–1997), AUBG Doctor of Humane Letters (1995)

Notable alumni
Anush Babajanyan, AUBG graduate, Class of 2006, Armenian photojournalist, member of VII Photo 
Uładzimir Katkoŭski, founder of the Belarusian Wikipedia, who worked for the Belarusian edition of Radio Free Europe
Evgeny Morozov, AUBG graduate, Class of 2005, author of The Net Delusion: The Dark Side of Internet Freedom (January 2011); a contributing editor to Foreign Policy, contributor to The Economist, The Wall Street Journal, Newsweek, The Washington Post, International Herald Tribune, Le Monde, and many others; visiting scholar at Stanford University

See also
Balkan Universities Network

References

External links 

 

Liberal arts colleges
Universities in Blagoevgrad
Educational institutions established in 1991
English as a global language
1991 establishments in Bulgaria